Odontocheilopteryx is a genus of moths in the family Lasiocampidae. The genus was first described by Wallengrenin 1860.

Species
Based on Afromoths:
Odontocheilopteryx conzolia Gurkovich & Zolotuhin, 2009
Odontocheilopteryx corvus Gurkovich & Zolotuhin, 2009
Odontocheilopteryx cuanza Gurkovich & Zolotuhin, 2009
Odontocheilopteryx dollmani Tams, 1930
Odontocheilopteryx eothina Tams, 1931
Odontocheilopteryx ferlina Gurkovich & Zolotuhin, 2009
Odontocheilopteryx foedifragus Gurkovich & Zolotuhin, 2009
Odontocheilopteryx gracifica Gurkovich & Zolotuhin, 2009
Odontocheilopteryx haribda Gurkovich & Zolotuhin, 2009
Odontocheilopteryx lajonquieri Rougeot, 1977
Odontocheilopteryx maculata Aurivillius, 1905
Odontocheilopteryx malagassy Viette, 1962
Odontocheilopteryx meridionalis Viette, 1962
Odontocheilopteryx myxa Wallengren, 1860
Odontocheilopteryx obscura Aurivillius, 1927
Odontocheilopteryx pattersoni Tams, 1926
Odontocheilopteryx phoneus Hering, 1928
Odontocheilopteryx pica Gurkovich & Zolotuhin, 2009
Odontocheilopteryx politzari Gurkovich & Zolotuhin, 2009
Odontocheilopteryx similis Tams, 1929
Odontocheilopteryx spicola Gurkovich & Zolotuhin, 2009
Odontocheilopteryx stokata Gurkovich & Zolotuhin, 2009

External links

Lasiocampidae